Unlady Like is the second album by  American rapper Mia X. It was released on June 24, 1997, on No Limit Records, distributed by Priority Records and EMI, and featured production from Beats By the Pound. The album made it to #21 on the Billboard 200 and #2 on the Top R&B/Hip-Hop Albums chart. The album was certified Gold by the RIAA. Fellow No Limit Soldiers Master P,  C-Murder, Silkk the Shocker, Mr. Serv-On, Fiend, Mac, Kane&Abel, KLC, Mystikal, Mercedes, Mo B Dick, O'Dell and Big Ed are featured, along with Foxy Brown. The song "The Party Don't Stop" charted on the Hot R&B/Hip Hop Airplay in August 1997.

Track listing
 "You Don't Wanna Go 2 War" – 5:26 (Featuring TRU & Mystikal) produced by KLC
 "The Party Don't Stop" – 4:13 (Featuring Master P & Foxy Brown) Produced by Craig B
 "I Pitty U" – 4:13 Produced by O'dell
 "Who Got tha Clout" – 3:22 (Featuring Mystikal) produced by O'dell
 "Ain't 2 be Played Wit" – 3:01 produced by Craig B
 "Unlady Like (feat. KLC)" – 4:24 produced by KLC
 "Intro" – 0:37
 "I'll Take Ya Man '97" – 4:47 produced by KLC
 "Let's Get It Straight (feat. Mystikal)" – 3:29 produced by KLC
 "4Ever Tru" – 5:19 (Featuring TRU) produced by Craig B
 "Bring da Drama" – 2:51 (Featuring Fiend, Big Ed & Mr. Serv-On) produced by Craig B
 "All Ns" – 4:09 produced by Craig B
 "Mama's Family" – 5:52 (Featuring Fiend, KLC, Kane & Abel, Mac, Mr. Serv-On) produced by Craig B
 "I Don't Know Why" – 4:28 (Featuring Mo B. Dick) produced by Mo B. Dick
 "Hoodlum Poetry" – 5:22 produced by Craig B
 "Rainy Dayz" – 4:52 produced by Mo B. Dick
 "Mommie's Angels" – 4:01 (Featuring Mo B. Dick)  produced by Mo B. Dick
 You & Me" – 4:38       (Featuring Odell, T.C.)
 "RIP, Jill" – 3:37  produced by KLC
 "Thank You" – 1:31 (Featuring Mo B. Dick, T.C., Mercedes) produced by O'dell & KLC

Charts

Weekly charts

Year-end charts

Certifications

References

1997 albums
Mia X albums
No Limit Records albums